Hermann Struck  (6 March 1876 – 11 January 1944) was a German Jewish artist known for his etchings.

Biography

Hermann Struck (Chaim Aaron ben David) was born in Berlin. He studied at the Berlin Academy of Fine Arts. In 1904, he joined the modern art movement known as the Berlin Secession.
In 1900, Struck met Jozef Israëls, a Dutch artist, who became his mentor. Both were recognized as leading artists of their time.

In 1908, Struck published "Die Kunst des Radierens" ("The Art of Etching"), which became a seminal work on the subject. It was a textbook that offered both theory and practical instruction. Struck's students included Marc Chagall, Lovis Corinth, Jacob Steinhardt, Lesser Ury and Max Liebermann.

In 1899, upon completing his studies at the Berlin Academy, he was banned from teaching there because he was Jewish. He signed his work with his Hebrew name, Chaim Aaron ben David, and a Star of David. Struck did commission portraits of Ibsen, Nietzsche, Freud, Albert Einstein, Herzl, Oscar Wilde and other leading figures of the time.

Struck was a fervent Zionist and Jewish activist. He visited the Land of Israel in 1903, displayed his art at the Fifth Zionist Congress, and was a founder of the Mizrachi Religious Zionist movement. At the same time, he was a German patriot and volunteered for military service in World War I serving as a translator, liaison officer and military artist. He was awarded the Iron Cross 1st Class and promoted to an officer for bravery, in 1917 he became the referent for Jewish affairs at the German Eastern Front High Command

Struck immigrated to Palestine in 1922, taught at Bezalel Academy and helped establish the Tel Aviv Museum of Art. He visited Berlin every summer until the Nazis rose to power.

He died in Haifa.

Collections

Struck Museum 
Struck's home in Haifa has been open as the Hermann Struck Museum since 2013.

Other institutions 
Besides the Hermann Struck Museum, Struck's work is held in the collections of several other institutions worldwide. These include the Brooklyn Museum, the Jewish Museum (Manhattan), the Haifa Museum of Art, the Leo Baeck Institute, New York, the University of Michigan Museum of Art, the British Museum, the Museum of New Zealand Te Papa Tongarewa, and the Fine Arts Museums of San Francisco.

Selected works

See also
Israeli art

References

External links

Figureworks.com/20th Century work 
Browse digitized art works by Hermann Struck at the Leo Baeck Institute, New York

Jewish artists
German etchers
German Zionists
Academic staff of Bezalel Academy of Arts and Design
German art educators
1876 births
1944 deaths
German lithographers
Jews in Ottoman Palestine
Jews in Mandatory Palestine
German Jewish military personnel of World War I
Artists from Berlin
German emigrants to Mandatory Palestine
20th-century lithographers